Soul on Ten is an album by American guitarist Robben Ford that was released on August 11, 2009. Eight of the tracks are live recordings from an appearance in San Francisco in April 2009. The album includes cover versions of "Spoonful" by Willie Dixon and "Please Set a Date" by Elmore James in addition to three new songs: "Earthquake", "Don’t Worry About Me", and "Thoughtless".

Track listing
All tracks composed by Robben Ford except where indicated
"Supernatural" (Kevin Sandbloom)
"Indianola"
"There'll Never Be Another You"
"Spoonful" (Willie Dixon)
"Nothin' to Nobody" (Ford, Michael MacDonald)
"Please Set a Date/You Don't Have To Go" (Elmore James)
"Earthquake"
"How Deep in the Blues (Do You Want To Go)" (Ford, Gary Nicholson)
"Don't Worry 'Bout Me"
"Thoughtless"

Personnel
 Robben Ford – guitar, vocals
 Neal Evans – organ
 Travis Carlton – bass guitar
 Toss Panos – drums

References

External links
"Soul on Ten" Review - Guitar International - Brian D Holland

2009 live albums
Robben Ford albums
Concord Records live albums